Miklós Bencze (19 June 1911 – 24 January 1992) was a Hungarian-American Jewish bass singer. He was born in Hungary and studied with tenor Manfredo Polverosi; he had his debut as Ferrando in Il Trovatore at the Hungarian State Opera in 1946. He also performed with the Budapest Municipal Opera Theatre and with opera companies in Vienna and Innsbruck. He married Budapest native Ilona Anna Szabari.

In 1957, after Soviet troops marched into Budapest to end the Hungarian Revolution of 1956, Bencze and his wife left Hungary and emigrated to the United States. There he received a Rockefeller Foundation grant and performed at Carnegie Hall in New York. While continuing his operatic career in major opera houses in roles such as Sparafucile, Leporello, Don Basilio and Mephisto, he took a position as a voice teacher and artist in residence at Baylor University in Waco, Texas.  In 1964 he accepted a similar position at the University of Mississippi. Among his pupils, he numbered many prominent singers and teachers. Finally, in 1977, he retired from the stage and taught voice at Wallace Community College in Dothan, Alabama.

References

1911 births
20th-century Hungarian male opera singers
Operatic basses
1992 deaths
Hungarian Jews
Hungarian emigrants to the United States